Lathrophytum is a monotypic genus of flowering plants belonging to the family Balanophoraceae. The only species is Lathrophytum peckoltii.

The species is found in Costa Rica, Brazil.

References

Balanophoraceae
Monotypic Santalales genera
Taxa named by August W. Eichler